Sonam is a given name. It is a Tibetan name meaning "merit". Separately, it is also a name in various Indo-Aryan languages.

People with this name include:

Buddhism
 Sönam Choklang, 2nd Panchen Lama (1438–1505)
 Sonam Gyatso, 3rd Dalai Lama (1543–1588), first officially recognized Dalai Lama
 Sonam Lhundrup (1456–1531), great abbot of Mustang 
 Sonam Rapten (1595–1658), senior official of the Gelugpa School
 Sonam Rinchen (1933–2013), Buddhist Geshe from Kham
 Jinpa Sonam (born 1955), Indian Buddhist teacher from Ladakh, director of the Indiana Buddhist center

Entertainers
 Sonam (actress) (born Bakhtavar Khan, 1972), Indian actress
 Sonam Bajwa (born 1989), Indian actress of Punjabi descent
 Sonam Bisht, Indian actress from Uttarakhand
 Sonam Kapoor (born 1985), Indian film actress and fashion icon
 Sonam Kinga, Bhutanese actor
 Sonam Lamba (born 1995), Indian actress from Chandigarh
 Sonam Lhamo (born 1988), Bhutanese actress
 Sonam Mukherjee (Indian actress from Mumbai
 Sonam Tshering Lepcha (1928–2020), Indian folk musician from Sikkim
 Soname Yangchen (born 1973), Tibetan singer and songwriter
 Tenzing Sonam (born 1959), Tibetan film director

Politics and government
 Sonom (died 1776), king of the rGyalrong people in China
 Sonam Drakpa (1359–1408), regent of Central Tibet
 Sonam Gyatso Lepcha, Indian politician from Sikkim
 Sonam Lama (born ), Indian politician from Sikkim
 Sonam Pelzom (born ), Bhutanese politician
 Sonam Topgay Dorji (1896–1953), Bhutanese politician
 Sonam Topgyal (1940–2012), Kalön Tripa of the Central Tibetan Administration
 Sonam Tobgye (born 1949), Bhutanese judge
 Sonam Venchungpa, Indian politician from Sikkim
 Sonam Wangchuk (born 1964), Indian Army veteran from Ladakh
 Jalley Sonam, Indian politician and trade unionist from Arunachal Pradesh

Sport
 Sonam Bhutia (born 1994), Indian footballer from Sikkim
 Sonam Chuki (born 1963), Bhutanese archer
 Sonam Gyatso (mountaineer) (1923–1968), Sikkimese mountaineer
 Sonam Tenzin (born 1986), Bhutanese footballer
 Sonam Tobgay (born 1990), Bhutanese cricketer and footballer
 Sonam Wangyal (born 1942), Indian mountaineer from Sikkim known for scaling Mount Everest
 Sonam Yoezer (born 1994), Bhutanese footballer

Other
 Sonam Dechen Wangchuck (born 1981), princess of Bhutan
 Sonam Dolma Brauen, (born 1953), Tibetan-Swiss painter
 Sonam Lotus, Indian meteorologist from Ladakh
 Sonam Wangchuk (engineer) (born 1966), Indian engineer from Ladakh

References

Tibetan names